Fred Nøddelund (1 April 1947 - 18 August 2016) was a Norwegian jazz musician (Flugelhorn), music arranger, record producer and bandleader known from several recordings and performances. He was festival composer at Moldejazz at a young age (Atlantis, 1970).  Moreover, he led the ensembles with the Oslo musicians Sture Janson, Svein Christiansen, and Knut Riisnæs.

Honors 
 1982: Gammleng-prisen in the category studio musician
 1983: Work of the year awarded by NOPA, for «Early winter morning»

Album 
 2005: In the Shade of Sea (Tylden Records).  Six pieces for flugelhorn and orchestra, with Aralsjøen. With contributions from Pete Knutsen and Jan Erik Kongshaug, and musicians from the symphony orchestra of Latvia, led by Terje Mikkelsen.

Contributions 
He has contributed on releases by the Christian rock group Good News from Ålesund (1971–75), as well as records by: 
 1973: Per Elvis Granberg: Real Rock'n'Roll
 1975: Jan Eggum: Jan Eggum
 1976: Einar Schanke: Nevergreen
 1976: Radiostorbandet
 1978: Erik Bye/Birgitte Grimstad: En Dobbel Deylighed,(music arrangements)
 1978, 1985 and 1997: Trond-Viggo Torgersen
 1978 Medvirkede på Iron Office LP "Ambience"
 1981: Arvid Martinsen Big Band (musician)
 1982: David Foster: Songwriter for the Stars (producer) 
 1982: Karin Krog: NRK sessions (from Club 7)
 1982: Det Norske Kammerkor
 1982: Dag Arnesen: Ny Bris
 1983: Bjørn Eidsvåg: Passe Gal
 1983: Pål Thowsen: (Sympathy)
 1983: Jens Wendelboe: ( 'lone Attic)
 1984: Graffiti Project
 1985: Sigvart Dagsland: Joker
 1985: Harald Heide-Steen Jr.: Sylfest Strutle, live at Gildevangen
 1986: Melodi Grand Prix: (jury member and bandleader, 1986)
 1992: Kristian Lindeman: (producer) 
He has also conducted Asker Big Band and Kolsås Big Band.

References 

2016 deaths
1947 births
Norwegian jazz composers
Norwegian jazz trumpeters
Male trumpeters
Big bands
Male jazz composers